Jason Hodges (born June 21, 1981) is an American politician. He is a Democrat who represents the 67th district in the Tennessee House of Representatives.

Biography

Hodges attended Northeast High School in Clarksville, Tennessee, and served in the United States Marine Corps. In 2012, he graduated cum laude from Austin Peay State University with a bachelor's degree in Political Science.

Hodges and his wife, Diana, have two children and live in Clarksville.

Political career

In 2014, Hodges was elected to the Montgomery County Commission.

In 2018, Hodges ran for election to the District 67 seat in the Tennessee House of Representatives. He got the endorsement of outgoing District 67 representative Joe Pitts. Hodges won the Democratic primary with 81.6% of the vote, and went on to win the general election with 52.5% of the vote.

Hodges sits on the following House committees:
 Education Committee
 Higher Education Subcommittee
 Insurance Committee
 Life & Health Insurance Subcommittee
 Naming, Designating & Private Acts Committee

Hodges is running for re-election in 2020.

Electoral record

References

Living people
Democratic Party members of the Tennessee House of Representatives
County commissioners in Tennessee
1981 births
People from Clarksville, Tennessee
Austin Peay State University alumni
21st-century American politicians